The vice president of Nigeria is the second-highest officer in the executive branch of the federal government of Nigeria, after the president of Nigeria, and ranks first in the presidential line of succession. Officially styled vice president of the Federal Republic of Nigeria, the vice president is directly elected together with the president to a four-year term of office.

The vice president is a statutory member of the National Security Council and thus plays a significant role in national security matters.

Yemi Osinbajo is the 14th and current vice president of Nigeria, he assumed office on 29 May 2015.

Eligibility
Candidates eligible for the office of vice president must be a citizen of Nigeria by birth, at least 40 years of age, a member of a political party and is sponsored by that political party.

Oath of office
The Constitution of Nigeria specifies an oath of office for the vice president of the federation. The oath is administered by the chief justice of the Supreme Court of Nigeria or the person for the time being appointed to exercise the functions of that office. It is the same oath recited by deputy state governors, ministers, commissioners and special advisers to the president.

Functions of the vice president of Nigeria
The executive functions of the Nigerian vice president includes participation in all cabinet meetings and, by statute, membership in the National Security Council, the National Defence Council, Federal Executive Council, and the Chairman of National Economic Council. Although the vice president may take an active role in establishing policy in the Executive Branch by serving on such committees and councils, the relative power of the Nigerian vice president's office depends upon the duties delegated by the president.

List of vice presidents

Military Government (1966–1979)

Major Chukwuma Kaduna Nzeogwu orchestrated the bloody military coup d'état of 1966 which overthrew the First Republic, parliamentary system of government was abolished and the office of the Vice President was established with Babafemi Ogundipe becoming the first Vice President as Chief of Staff, Supreme Headquarters.

Second Republic (1979–1983)

Under the 1979 Constitution, the second constitution of the Federal Republic of Nigeria, the President was both head of state and government. The president along with the vice president were elected for a four-year term. In the event of a vacancy, the Vice President would have served as acting president.

Military Government (1983–1993)

Major-General Muhammadu Buhari was made military head of state following the coup d'ètat of 1983, which overthrew the Second Republic, Major General Tunde Idiagbon became the Chief of Staff, Supreme Headquarters.

Interim National Government (1993)

Chief Ernest Shonekan was made interim head of state of Nigeria following the crisis of the Third Republic. He initially announced his vice president to be Moshood Abiola the supposed winner of the 12 June 1993 elections, which the latter rejected stating he was the rightful successor to the presidency.

Military Government (1993–1999)

General Sani Abacha led the palace coup d'ètat of 1993 which overthrew the Interim National Government, Lieutenant general Oladipo Diya became the Chief of General Staff.

Fourth Republic (1999–present)

Under the fourth Constitution of the Republic of Nigeria, the president is head of both state and government. The president along with the vice president are elected for a four-year renewable term. In the event of a vacancy,  the Vice President serves as acting president.

Vice presidents by time in office

Residence 
The Vice President of Nigeria resides at Akinola Aguda House.

See also 

List of Governors-General of Nigeria
List of heads of state of Nigeria
List of heads of government of Nigeria

References 

Government of Nigeria
Nigeria
 
Vice President
1966 establishments in Nigeria